The  St. Mary's Church also called Church of the Nativity of the Blessed Virgin, is the name given to a temple of the Armenian Apostolic Church in the center of the city of Tskhinvali, the capital of South Ossetia, an independent region de facto that Georgia claims as part of his territory. The church was damaged in the night of 7 to 8 August 2008 during a bombing in the war between Russia and Georgia. The church is currently used by various Orthodox Christian groups in the country.

The Church of the Blessed Virgin was built in 1718. From the south, near the door, an inscription on a large stone. It has a dome. It was built in brick and stone. Masonry walls of the facade are embedded with large crosses and arches.

See also
Christianity in Georgia
St. Mary's Church (disambiguation)

References

Churches in South Ossetia
Buildings and structures in Tskhinvali
Churches in Georgia (country)